Freedom Bird may refer to:
Government contract flight
Liberation Tigers of Tamil Eelam#Women in LTTE
 Name of the DC-10 Aircraft N701TZ / N139WA written off during a hard landing in Baltimore (BWI) while being operated by World Airways  instead of  ATA Airlines due to an asset transfer initiated by MatlinPatterson's Global Aero Logistics.

See also 
Kurdistan Freedom Hawks a Kurdish militant group